There have been many Bengali female actors who have acted predominantly in Indian Bengali cinema or Hindi cinema or both.

List of actresses from West Bengal

List of actresses predominantly in Bengali films

 Alokananda Roy
 Alpana Goswami
 Amrita Chattopadhyay
 Anamika Saha
 Anindita Bose
 Anjana Basu
 Anjana Bhowmick
 Anubha Gupta
 Anuradha Roy (actress)
 Anashua Majumdar
 Anushree Das
 Aparna Sen
 Aparajita Auddy
 Aparajita Ghosh Das
 Arati Bhattacharya
 Arpita Chatterjee
 Arundhati Devi
 Arunima Ghosh
 Arijita Mukherjee
 Arpita Mukherjee
 Basabi Nandi
 Bipasha Basu
 Bidipta Chakraborty
 Chandrabati Devi
 Chhaya Devi
 Chaiti Ghoshal
 Chaitali Dasgupta
 Chandrayee Ghosh
 Chitra Sen
 Churni Ganguly
 Darshana Banik
 Debashree Roy
 Debika Mukherjee
 Debolina Dutta
 Ditipriya Roy
 Ena Saha
 Farida Akhtar Babita
 Gita Dey
 Gita Nag
 Ishaa Saha
 Indrani Dutta
 Indrani Haldar
 Jaya Bachchan
 Jaya Ahsan
 Jaya Seal
 Jhilik Bhattacharjee
 June Malia
 Kanan Devi
 Karuna Banerjee
 Kaberi Bose
 Kajal Gupta
 Kanika Majumdar
 Konkona Sen Sharma
 Koushani Mukherjee
 Koel Mallick
 Kaninika Banerjee
 Kamalika Banerjee
 Lily Chakravarty
 Laboni Sarkar
 Locket Chatterjee
 Madhabi Mukherjee
 Meenakshi Goswami
 Moushumi Chatterjee
 Mithu Mukherjee
 Mahua Roychoudhury
 Mamata Shankar
 Moon Moon Sen
 Mithu Chakrabarty
 Mousumi Saha
 Monami Ghosh
 Manali Dey
 Mimi Chakraborty
 Madhumita Sarcar
 Mumtaz Sorcar
 Moubani Sorcar
 Moyna Mukherjee
 Nandini Chatterjee
 Nandini Ghosal
 Nandini Malia
 Nayana Bandopadhyay
 Nusrat Jahan
 Padma Devi
 Papiya Adhikari
 Pallavi Chatterjee
 Paoli Dam
 Parno Mittra
 Payel Sarkar
 Puja Banerjee
 Priyanka Sarkar
 Priyanka Upendra
 Payel De
 Pallavi Sharma
 Rachna Banerjee
 Raima Sen
 Rajeswari Roy Choudhry
 Ratna Ghoshal
 Rita Dutta Chakraborty
 Ridhima Ghosh
 Rimjhim Mitra
 Rita Dutta Chakraborty
 Rita Koiral
 Ritabhari Chakraborty
 Rituparna Sengupta
 Rukmini Maitra
 Ruma Guha Thakurta
 Rakhee Gulzar
 Roopa Ganguly
 Rajanya Mitra
 Rukma Roy
 Sagarika
 Sarajubala Devi
 Suchitra Sen
 Sabitri Chatterjee
 Supriya Devi
 Sandhya Roy
 Sharmila Tagore
 Swatilekha Sengupta
 Sumitra Mukherjee
 Shakuntala Barua
 Soma Dey
 Soma Mukherjee
 Sonali Gupta
 Sanghamitra Bandyopadhyay (actress)
 Sreela Majumdar
 Satabdi Roy
 Sreelekha Mitra
 Sohini Sengupta
 Sudipta Chakraborty
 Swastika Mukherjee
 Swastika Dutta
 Soumitrisha Kundu
 Sayantika Banerjee
 Samata Das
 Saayoni Ghosh
 Sohini Sarkar
 Sonamoni Saha
 Srabanti Chatterjee
 Sraboni Bhuniya
 Subhashree Ganguly
 Tanusree Shankar
 Tulika Basu
 Tanni Laharoy
 Trina Saha
 Umasashi

List of actresses predominantly in Hindi films

 Amala Akkineni
 Anita Guha
 Bipasha Basu
 Debashree Roy
 Devika Rani
 Indrani Haldar
 Jaya Bhaduri
 Jhilik Bhattacharya
 Kajol
 Koena Mitra
 Konkona Sen Sharma
 Lisa Ray
 Lolita Chatterjee 
 Mahima Chaudhry
 Mouni Ray
 Moushumi Chatterjee
 Nandana Sen
 Paoli Dam
 Priyanka Kothari
 Preeti Ganguly
 Raakhee
 Rachana Banerjee
 Raima Sen
 Rani Mukerji
 Reema Sen
 Richa Gangopadhyay
 Rimi Sen
 Rituparna Sengupta
 Riya Sen
 Roopa Ganguly
 Sagarika
 Shahana Goswami
 Sharmila Tagore
 Suchitra Sen
 Sumitra Devi
 Sushmita Sen
 Sumita Sanyal
 Swastika Mukherjee
 Tanisha
 Tanushree Dutta
 Umasashi

See also
List of Bangladeshi actresses

Bengali actresses
Bengali actresses
Actresses